The tables below show information and statistics about the members of the Swiss Federal Council (in German: Bundesrat, in French: conseil fédéral, in Italian: consiglio federale), or Federal Councilors (in German: Bundesräte, in French: conseillers fédéraux, in Italian: consiglieri federali).

The Swiss Federal Council is the seven-member executive council which constitutes the government as well as the head of state of Switzerland. Each of the seven Federal Councillors heads a department of the Swiss federal government. The members of the Federal Council are elected for a term of four years by both chambers of the federal parliament sitting together as the Federal Assembly. Each Councillor is elected individually by secret ballot by an absolute majority of votes. Since 1848, the seven Councillors have never been replaced simultaneously, thus guaranteeing a continuity of the government.

Once elected for a four-year-term, Federal Councillors can neither be voted out of office by a motion of no confidence nor can they be impeached. Reelection is possible for an indefinite number of terms, and it has historically been extremely rare for Parliament not to reelect a sitting Councillor and this has only happened four times. In practice, therefore, Councillors serve until they decide to resign and retire to private life, usually after three to five terms of office.

Parties

Time in office

The following tables do not include councilors currently in office.

Age (oldest and youngest)

Lifespan

References
 
 The Swiss Confederation: A brief guide 2006, edited by the Swiss Federal Chancellery.
 , compiled by the services of the Swiss Parliament.
 Clive H. Church (2004). The Politics and Government of Switzerland. Palgrave Macmillan. .

External links
Chronological index of Federal Councillors, on the official website of the Swiss Federal Council.

List
Swiss Federal Council
Swiss Federal Council